This is a list of defunct airlines of Chile.

See also
List of airlines of Chile
List of airports in Chile

References

Chile
Airlines
Airlines, defunct